Mayerhofen Airport is a private use airport located near Mayerhofen, Carinthia, Austria.

See also
List of airports in Austria

References

External links 
 Airport record for Mayerhofen Airport at Landings.com

Airports in Austria
Carinthia (state)